The Ankara–Sivas high-speed railway, is a  long high-speed railway currently under construction in Turkey. The first portion of the line opened in February 2023; the  section between Balışeyh and Sivas. Once the entire line is completed, it will become the second longest high-speed railway in Turkey after the Ankara–Istanbul high-speed railway. Travel time between Ankara and Sivas will be reduced to 2 hours and 50 minutes, from the current journey time around 9 hours and 30 minutes. The railway will also serve as an extension of the Ankara-Istanbul HSR with a total journey time from Istanbul to Sivas at around 7 hours.

History and the project

As there's no direct railway link between Ankara and Sivas, the travel time by train takes too much time compared to road transport. Railway link between Ankara and Sivas passes through Kayseri currently. In line with TCDD's willing to increase the part of rail transport in global transportation, survey for a new high-speed railway line began on 2004. Constructions began in 2008 with major stops during 2010 due to changes in the project. When completed, the journey time is expected to be reduced to 2h and 50min compared to 12h (currently). Testing on the line began in March 2020, with opening projected for 2022.

Sections and speeds
Constructions are divided into four sections:

See also
High-speed rail in Turkey
Yüksek Hızlı Tren
Elmadağ Bridge

References

High-speed railway lines in Turkey
Standard gauge railways in Turkey